Alex Saxon may refer to:

 Alex Saxon (actor), American actor
 Bill Pronzini (born 1943), American writer of detective fiction who published several novels under pen name Alex Saxon